Kalpavriksha may refer to:
 Kalpavriksha, a mythological tree
 Morus (plant), a mulberry tree
 Parijaat tree, Kintoor, locally known as Kalpavriksha
 Adansonia digitata, the baobab
 Kalpavriksh, an Indian Non-Governmental Organisation